Clypeolum owenianum is a species of small freshwater snail with an operculum, an aquatic gastropod mollusk in the family Neritidae, the nerites.

Distribution
This species is found in Africa: in Angola, Cameroon, Ivory Coast, Equatorial Guinea, Gabon, Ghana, Liberia, and Nigeria.

Habitat
This small nerite lives in rivers.

References

 Eichhorst T.E. (2016). Neritidae of the world. Volume 1. Harxheim: Conchbooks. 695 pp

External links
 Wood, W. (1828). Supplement to the Index Testaceologicus; or A catalogue of Shells, British and Foreign. Richard Taylor, London. Iv [+1 + 59 pp., plates 1-8]
 Binder E. (1955). Mollusques nouveaux de Côte d'Ivoire. Prosobranches d'eau douce. Revue Suisse de Zoologie. 62:73–82.

Neritidae
Gastropods of Africa
Gastropods described in 1828
Invertebrates of Equatorial Guinea
Freshwater snails
Taxonomy articles created by Polbot